Slovenian Air Force and Air Defence is a part of the Slovenian Armed Forces. It is an integral part of the command structure, not an independent branch.

Duties

Slovenian Air Force and Air Defence aim is securing the sovereignty of the airspace of the Republic of Slovenia and providing air support to other services in the implementation of their tasks in joint operations. Its main tasks are:
 Inspection and control of the air space security
 Providing help in natural, humanitarian, and technological disasters
 Search and rescue operations
 Taking part in international missions and operations

Since Slovenia does not have the air capabilities to police its airspace in accordance with NATO standards, nor does it plan to develop such capabilities, these tasks are performed alternately by the Italian and Hungarian Air Forces under NATO command.

History

Slovenian contact with military aviation began during World War I, when the army and navy air services of Austria-Hungary conscripted large numbers of personnel from throughout the Empire. As the Empire began to collapse during 1918, Slovenian aircrew and ground crew switched their allegiance to the Kingdom of Serbs, Croats and Slovenes. Aircraft found on Slovenian territory were taken over by the Slovenian authorities and formed into a fledgling air arm. The new air arm was soon involved in the conflict with Austria over the border provinces of Carinthia and south Styria. Later in 1919, the Slovenian air units were absorbed into the Royal Yugoslav Air Force.

In 1968 a reserve volunteer force, the Teritorialna Obramba (Territorial Defence of the Socialist Republic of Slovenia), was established to defend local key locations in time of crisis. The Slovenian Territorial Defence HQ had a small auxiliary aviation unit stationed at Ljubljana-Polje airfield by 1969, when Government Factories Type 522 advanced trainers were being operated. These aircraft were borrowed from the Yugoslav Air Force and not owned by Slovenia. Slovenian Territorial Defence ceased to be a part of the Yugoslavian auxiliary forces on 21 June 1991, (four days prior of the proclamation of independence), when the Yugoslav army seized 12 Soko J-20 Kraguj aircraft from them.

On 28 June 1991 a Yugoslav Air Force Gazelle defected to Slovenia, providing the first helicopter for the Territorial Defence Force. During the war it also was equipped with three ex-Police Bell 412s and an Agusta A-109A. On 9 June 1992 the Air Force Unit of the Slovenian Army was renamed into 15 Brigada Vojaskega Letalstva. The 15 Brigada was divided into two squadrons, one fixed-wing and one helicopter squadron, flying from two bases, Brnik airport and Cerklje ob Krki. The 15 Brigada was under control of the 1 Air Force and Air Defence Force Command located at Kranj. In 2004 Slovenia entered NATO. Now NATO is responsible for protecting Slovenian airspace. On 8 November 2004 the 15 Brigada was officially disbanded. In its place three new units were formed.

The 15 Air Force Brigade was restructured into the 15 Helicopter Battalion, the Air Force School, and the Air Force Base. The 15 Helicopter Battalion is located at the Brnik air base. The unit is equipped with eight Bell 412 helicopters and four AS-532 Cougar helicopters. The units duties are to organise training courses for pilots and technical staff, to organise search and rescue missions and operate within the System of Civil Protection, Help and Rescue, to secure cargo transportation to mountain areas, to extinguish fires, and to provide air support for SAF units.

The Air Force Military School is located at the Cerklje ob Krki air base. The school conducts the basic and advance training programmes for future air force pilots in two Zlin 142L and eight Zlin 242L planes and four Bell 206 Jet Ranger helicopters, organises practices for air force pilots, provides fire support, and carries out various tasks for other branches of the armed forces by using the two PC-9 and nine PC-9M planes. A part of the Air Force Military School is also the parachute squad, located at the Brnik air base, which organises basic and advanced parachute training for SAF members.

The Air Force Base, located at the Cerklje ob Krki air base, carries out logistic support, such as fuel supply. The unit is equipped with two PC-6 planes and one L-410 plane. The Air Force Base unites the air supply squad and the technical support unit whose main tasks are to plan and conduct the second stage of aircraft maintenance, carry out technical personnel training, update aircraft documentation, etc. Another restructuring took place in 2007 when the Air Force School and the 15 Helicopter Battalion were made into a single command making logistics easier, and reduce staff. Following the decision to operate jet aircraft from 2015 again, major restructuring will take place at Cerklje.

Due to reorganization of the Slovenian Armed Forces, the Air Defense and Aviation Brigade will be reconstructed to the 15th Wing (Military Aviation Regiment). The Wing will consist of 151st Rotary Wing Squadron, 152nd Fixed Wing Squadron, 153rd Aircraft Maintenance Squadron, 16th Air Space Control and Surveillance Centre, 107th Air Base and Flight School. Air Defense elements will be moved to Ground Forces.

Aircraft

Current inventory 

Note: Three C-17 Globemaster III's are available through the Heavy Airlift Wing based in Hungary.

Retired 
Previous aircraft operated were an Agusta-Bell 212, Agusta A.109, Aérospatiale Gazelle, Utva 66 and a UTVA 75 trainer.

Acquisition of new aircraft
The Slovenian Ministry of Defense tested the EADS CASA C-295 and the C-27J Spartan in Cerklje AFB in 2007. Two Casa C-295 were chosen, with the first one to be delivered in 2008 and the second in 2010. The first aircraft was ordered in January 2008, but in February the aircraft order was frozen because of the Mirosławiec air accident in Poland.

In 2021, the Slovenian Ministry of Defense ordered at least one C-27J Spartan. The estimated delivery date is set to be in 2023.

Incidents and accidents
 In 1993 a UTVA-75 crashed in Slovenj Gradec airport. 
 In 1994 a Let L-410 Turbolet hit HT wires on landing in Brnik. It was later repaired.
 In 1994 a Aérospatiale Gazelle crashed among the trees in Kočevska Reka with 4 members who were slightly injured.
 In 2004 a Pilatus PC-9 crashed in Lenart, resulting in the death of Major Drago Svetina.
 In 2008 a Pilatus PC-9 with a pilot candidate ejected, the plane was not damaged and returned safely with the other pilot to Cerklje ob Krki Airbase.
In 2019 a Pilatus PC-9 hit electrical wire while flying under power line close to Bukovje. The plane landed safely at Maribor Edvard Rusjan Airport.
 In 2019 a Pilatus PC-9 did a runway excursion during landing in Portorož Airport the plane tyres were destroyed pilot was not injured
In 2019 a Eurocopter AS532 Cougar hit the branch with the tip of the rotor arm, the tip of the rotor was damaged. Event happened above the valley of Vrata.

Ranks

References

Air forces by country
Brigades of Slovenia
Military units and formations established in 1992
Aviation in Slovenia